The 1969–70 New Orleans Buccaneers season was the 3rd and final season of the Buccaneers in the ABA. The team was 22-12 by the beginning of 1970 in part due to two 6 game winning streaks. But an eight-game losing streak (from February 22-March 8) plummeted the team from 31-24 to 31-32, and the team remained around .500 from there on, winning their last two games of the season to finish at exactly .500. The Bucs were 10th in points scored, with 107.9 points per game, and 2nd in points allowed at 107.1 points per game. However, the team finished one game out of the final playoff spot to the Los Angeles Stars. The team did not have as much success with attendance, and plans were made to play home games throughout the state (even renaming themselves as the Louisiana Buccaneers), such as Shreveport, Lafayette, Monroe and Baton Rouge. But on August 21, 1970, P. L. Blake bought the team, moving it to Memphis, Tennessee ten days later to become the Memphis Pros. New Orleans would not have a pro basketball team until 1974 with the Jazz.

Roster
 14 Tom Bowens – Point forward
 10 Mike Butler – Shooting guard
 34 Lee Davis – Point forward
 11 Ronald Franz – Small forward
 25 Gerald Govan – Center
 15 Jimmy Jones – Point guard
 23 Steve Jones – Shooting guard
 32 Jackie Moreland – Small forward
 12 Ron Perry – Shooting guard
 21 Red Robbins – Point forward
 22 Jerry Rook – Forward
 24 Skeeter Swift – Shooting guard
 31 Jasper Wilson – Small forward

Final standings

Western Division

Awards, records, and honors
1968 ABA All-Star Game played on January 24, 1970
 Jimmy Jones 
 Steve Jones
 Gerald Govan
 Red Robbins (injured, did not play)

References

 Buccaneers on Basketball Reference

New Orleans
New Orleans Buccaneers
New Orleans Buccaneers, 1969-70
New Orleans Buccaneers, 1969-70